Nifft the Lean is a fantasy novel by Michael Shea published in 1982.

Plot summary
Nifft the Lean is a collection of four stories involving the master thief Nifft.

Reception
Nifft the Lean won the World Fantasy Award for Best Novel in 1983.

Dave Langford reviewed Nifft the Lean for White Dwarf #42, and stated that "In this garish hell, people suffer grotesque transformations and torments, described with vast relish and elaboration; the visceral variety of Shea's unpleasantness never flags, and the gaudy landscapes infect your dreams. I enjoyed this one."

Reviews
Review by Faren Miller (1982) in Locus, #263 December 1982 
Review by Baird Searles (1983) in Isaac Asimov's Science Fiction Magazine, June 1983 
Review by Vincent Omniaveritas (1983) in Cheap Truth #1 
Review by Algis Budrys (1984) in The Magazine of Fantasy & Science Fiction, August 1984 
Review by David Pringle (1988) in Modern Fantasy: The Hundred Best Novels

See also 

 World Fantasy Award for Best Novel

References

1982 novels
American fantasy novels
Fantasy novels